= Oligonol =

Names
- Other names Olg

Identifiers
CAS Number	851983-55-6
- Except where otherwise noted, data are given for materials in their standard state (at 25 °C [77 °F], 100 kPa). Infobox references

Oligonol is a mixture of low molecular weight polyphenols found in lychee fruit. Oligonol is thought to have antioxidant and anti-influenza virus actions. In addition, preliminary research in animal models suggest it may improve blood flow in organs, maintain muscle, reduce weight, and protect skin from harmful UV rays. Little is known about the long term safety of supplements containing oligonol due to the lack of scientific research.
